Albert Brunner (17 July 1918 – 7 May 1943) was a German Luftwaffe ace and recipient of the Knight's Cross of the Iron Cross during World War II. Brunner claimed 53 aerial victories, all over the Eastern Front. The Knight's Cross of the Iron Cross was awarded to recognise extreme battlefield bravery or successful military leadership.

Brunner was killed in action on 7 May 1943 near Petsamo, Finland. Too low for his parachute to fully deploy, he fell to his death. His victor may have been Leytenant Nikolai Andreevich Bokii. Posthumously, Brunner was awarded the Knight’s Cross of the Iron Cross on 3 July 1943.

Summary of career

Aerial victory claims
According to Obermaier, Brunner was credited with 53 aerial victories claimed in 135 combat missions, all of which claimed on the Eastern Front. Mathews and Foreman, authors of Luftwaffe Aces — Biographies and Victory Claims, researched the German Federal Archives and also state that he was credited with 53 aerial victory claims.

Awards
 Iron Cross (1939) 2nd and 1st Class
 Front Flying Clasp of the Luftwaffe in Gold
 Honour Goblet of the Luftwaffe on 12 April 1943 as Oberfeldwebel and pilot
 German Cross in Gold on 4 June 1943 as Oberfeldwebel in the 6./Jagdgeschwader 5
 Knight's Cross of the Iron Cross on 3 July 1943 as Oberfeldwebel and pilot in the 6./Jagdgeschwader 5

References

Citations

Bibliography

External links
TracesOfWar.com
Ritterkreuztraeger 1939-1945

1918 births
1943 deaths
Aviators killed by being shot down
People from Bad Mergentheim
People from the Kingdom of Württemberg
German World War II flying aces
Luftwaffe pilots
Recipients of the Gold German Cross
Recipients of the Knight's Cross of the Iron Cross
Luftwaffe personnel killed in World War II
Military personnel from Baden-Württemberg